"The Return of Mr. Bean" is the second episode of the British television series Mr. Bean, produced by Tiger Television for Thames Television. It was first broadcast on ITV on 5 November 1990.

This was the first episode to be co-written by regular collaborator Robin Driscoll (alongside Richard Curtis and Rowan Atkinson) and the first to feature the familiar Howard Goodall choral Latin-dubbed theme (Ecce homo qui est faba, English for Behold the Man, Who is a Bean) performed by the choir of Southwark Cathedral. It is the first episode to also introduce the familiar title sequence, albeit in a Black and white format.

Plot

Act 1: The Department Store 
On his way to an Allders department store, Mr. Bean encounters a busker (Dave O'Higgins) playing a tenor saxophone and finds himself unable to give him any change, as he only has a banknote on him. Having an idea, he places a handkerchief on the road nearby and performs a rather silly dance, allowing him to get some change from an elderly woman, which he quickly places in the busker's saxophone case before disappearing through the nearby tunnel.

Before long, Bean arrives at the store and takes a moment to admire his new American Express charge card. After having to flee from the perfume department upon feeling overwhelmed by the fragrances, he soon begins searching for items to buy, testing them out first, with some done in unusual fashion – he removes a toothbrush from its packet to see how it feels on his teeth, tries on a towel, finds a good peeler by using it on a fresh potato he brought with him and tests two frying pans for size with a raw fish he had inside his jacket. When looking for a new telephone, Bean finds the ones on display don't have a dialing tone and thinks they don't work, but eventually takes one from a receptionist's desk when he finds it works, unaware that it isn't for sale.

At the checkout, he sets his card on the counter, only for another customer (Paul McDowell) to mistakenly take it after accidentally covering up his own charge card of the same kind that the cashier (William Vandyck) had returned. Bean, realizing this, pickpockets the man and swaps the cards back (instead of simply speaking with the man about the mix-up), but while returning the customer's wallet to his back pocket, he gets his hand stuck and finds himself being unwittingly pulled all the way into the men's toilets. In the cubicle, Bean finds himself trapped, with the customer not knowing he is there until he helps him to find the toilet roll; though the man initially accepts gratefully, he suddenly realizes that he is not alone in the cubicle and jumps up in fright as Bean smiles nervously at him.

Act 2: The Restaurant 
Bean goes to a fancy restaurant to celebrate his birthday. While making his choice and leaving the money for the food on a plate, he writes out a birthday card to himself, feigning surprise upon opening and reading it. When the maitre d' (John Junkin) returns, Bean orders what he thinks will be a regular steak, and as he waits for his food, he takes a moment to sample some of the house wine before using the glasses on his table to chime out "Happy Birthday to Me". When the waiter (Roger Lloyd-Pack) arrives with his meal, Bean pays him for the meal, making him think he is being given a generous tip. Upon being left to eat his meal, Bean realizes that he ordered a steak tartare, whereupon he becomes disgusted by the meal upon tasting a bit of it and being forced to swallow the first bite so as to avoid upsetting the restaurant staff. Seeking to avoid eating the rest of it, Bean cuts it up and sticks bits of the meal in random places on his table. First, he hides some of it in an ashtray then a tiny flower vase, before hollowing out a portion of the bread roll on his table and using the hollow to hide more of the meal, before sliding some under a small plate, and another portion within the base of a sugar bowl.

Shortly after this, a violinist (Steve McNicholas) walks towards his table and, spotting his card, plays "Happy Birthday" for him, before playing another tune, holding on a note until Bean eats another piece of steak. As soon as the violinist turns his back on him, Bean spits it down the man's trousers. Spotting that a woman on a neighboring table is distracted by the tunes of the violin, Bean takes her handbag and puts pieces of the steak into it, but while putting it back, he manages to make the waiter trip up over his outstretched leg. Using this opportunity to cover up his actions, Bean declares that the accident caused his meal to be spread everywhere he hid it, leading the maitre d' to apologize for the accident and relocate him to another table. The waiter soon brings over a new meal on the house, which, to Bean's horror, turns out to be another steak tartare which is slightly larger than the original. Bean is now faced with the prospect of eating it, as the waiter, maitre d' and violinist are all watching him.

Act 3: The Royal Premiere 
Later, the cinema is preparing to host a royal premiere attended by a member of the royal family (intended to be Queen Elizabeth The Queen Mother, but simply given as "The Royal" in the credits). The staff line up in the foyer, awaiting the arrival of the royal party. Bean arrives a little late but is excited to greet the royal, wondering how to do so and eventually deciding upon a swift bow. As he stands in line between the cinema's manager (Robin Driscoll) and an usherette (Matilda Ziegler), Bean notices that all the men have their shoes polished except for him, so he uses his own spit to polish his shoes. When he notices the manager checking his breath, he soon checks his own and decides to use a breath freshener in his mouth. Bean then becomes concerned that his teeth are not clean and snags a loose thread from the usherette's uniform to floss his teeth, only for the thread to get stuck between them. He eventually yanks it out before briefly turning away to scream in pain.

Content the royal will be impressed with his fresh breath and clean teeth, Bean soon finds that the men all have pocket handkerchiefs within their smart evening suits. After unsuccessfully attempting to steal the manager's own, Bean uses the white, blank side of a postcard to create a makeshift one. Bean then notices his fingernails are not clean and opts to use the fly of his trousers to clean them, finishing up just as the royal arrives. As she begins to greet the staff, Bean realizes he forgot to zip up his flies, panicking when they become stuck and then when he sticks his hand down his trousers to pull them up and leaves his finger stuck out through them in a rather lewd manner. Fortunately, he manages to remove his finger and zip his trousers up in time, but upon greeting the royal with his swift bow, he accidentally headbutts her and knocks her to the ground. As staff and security rush in to help her up, Bean makes a swift run for the exit as the episode ends.

Cast
 Rowan Atkinson as Mr. Bean and the news reporter (off-camera)
 Dave O'Higgins as the busker
 Paul McDowell as the fellow customer at the department store
 William Vandyck as the checkout manager
 John Junkin as the maitre d'
 Roger Lloyd-Pack as the waiter
 Steve McNicholas as the violinist
 Matilda Ziegler as the usherette
 Robin Driscoll as man in toilet and the cinema manager
 Tina Maskall as the royal

Production 
Most of the opening act was recorded on OB videotape at an Allders department store in Sutton, although the opening scene was filmed at an underpass in Twickenham. The rest of the episode was recorded before a live audience at Thames Television's Teddington Studios.

In 1991, it was announced 20th Century Fox had a feature film adaptation of Mr. Bean in development. They remade Act 3 into a short film: Mr. Bean Goes to a Première and attached it to their theatrical releases. It was also included on the UK VHS rental release of Hot Shots! Part Deux.

The remastered version of the episode replaces the original black and white opening title with the standard "street" version.

References

External links 
 

Mr. Bean episodes
1990 British television episodes
Television shows written by Rowan Atkinson
Television shows written by Richard Curtis
Television shows written by Robin Driscoll